Jade Bridget Clarke  (born 17 October 1983 in Manchester, England) is an English netball player. Primarily a midcourt defender, Clarke was selected for the England national netball team in 2002, making her senior debut the following year against New Zealand. During her international career, she has competed at five Netball World Championships (2003, 2007, 2011, 2015 and 2019), four Commonwealth Games (2006, 2010 and 2014, 2018), and the 2009 and 2011 World Netball Series. Clarke plays domestic netball in the Netball Superleague, having played four seasons with Loughborough Lightning before switching to the Northern Thunder for 2009–10. In 2010, Clarke was signed to play in the Australasian ANZ Championship with New Zealand–based team the Waikato Bay of Plenty Magic, as a Temporary Replacement Player for injured midcourter Peta Scholz.

In 2011, she was named as the captain of England, after the retirement of Karen Atkinson after the 2011 Netball World Championships. She captained them to a first ever gold medal in the 2011 World Netball Series. In 2012, she signed on to play for the NZ Franchise, Northern Mystics for the ANZ Championships. She signed with the Canterbury Tactix for the 2013 season. After 2 seasons with the Canterbury Tactix Clarke signed with the Sydney-based NSW Swifts signing as their import player. On 21 September 2014, Clarke was inducted into the England Netball Hall of Fame. In September 2015, it was confirmed that she had re-signed for Loughborough Lightning. On 20 February 2016, it was announced she would be returning to Australia to play for Adelaide Thunderbirds. She stayed in Australia until 2018, when she returned to England to play for Wasps Netball. Clarke was a member of the gold medal winning England team at the 2018 Commonwealth Games. She was also selected in the 12-player squad for the Roses at the 2019 Netball World Cup.

Clarke was appointed Member of the Order of the British Empire (MBE) in the 2023 New Year Honours for services to netball.

Personal life 
Jade Clarke was born in 1983 in Manchester and later studied Sports Science at Loughborough University.

ANZ Championship accolades
 2014 Mainland Tactix Members' Player of the Year
 2013 Tactix Player of the Year

National Representation
 2002–present England Netball Team
 2014 England Netball Captain

Netball Career Facts
 Inducted into the England Netball Hall of Fame
 2014 England Commonwealth Games Netball Team Captain
 2011, 2015 World Netball Championship Bronze Medal with England
 2011 FastNet World Netball Series Gold Medal with England (as Captain)
 2006, 2010 Commonwealth Games Bronze Medal with England
 2018, Commonwealth games Gold medal with England

References 

English netball players
Commonwealth Games bronze medallists for England
Commonwealth Games gold medallists for England
Netball players at the 2006 Commonwealth Games
Netball players at the 2010 Commonwealth Games
New South Wales Swifts players
Mainland Tactix players
Northern Mystics players
Waikato Bay of Plenty Magic players
1983 births
Living people
Sportspeople from Manchester
Commonwealth Games medallists in netball
Netball Superleague players
Netball players at the 2018 Commonwealth Games
2019 Netball World Cup players
Loughborough Lightning netball players
Wasps Netball players
Manchester Thunder players
AENA Super Cup players
Adelaide Thunderbirds players
English expatriate netball people in New Zealand
English expatriate netball people in Australia
2011 World Netball Championships players
2015 Netball World Cup players
Netball players at the 2022 Commonwealth Games
Members of the Order of the British Empire
Medallists at the 2006 Commonwealth Games
Medallists at the 2010 Commonwealth Games
Medallists at the 2018 Commonwealth Games